André Bernier may refer to:
André Bernier (meteorologist) (born 1959), American meteorologist
André Bernier (politician) (1930–2012), former Canadian politician and accountant